Apatelodes lapitha is a moth in the family Apatelodidae. It is found in Veracruz, Mexico.

References

Apatelodidae
Moths described in 1900